The red tide crisis in Chiloé, also known as "Chilote May", was a social, economic and environmental catastrophe that occurred in the Chiloé Archipelago, southern Chile, in the southern autumn of 2016, as a result of a severe algal bloom of the dinoflagellate Alexandrium catenella — a microalgae responsible for the phenomenon known as red tide. The bloom, which spread between the months of March and April throughout the outer sea of ​​the Los Lagos Region, the inland coast of Chiloé and the Chacao Channel, affected thousands of artisanal fishermen on the Chiloé Island —in addition to from other communes such as Calbuco, Maullín and Puerto Montt —the regional capital—due to the prohibition of extracting resources from the sea, since they were contaminated with paralytic shellfish poison (PSP).

The severe economic effects and the poor response provided by the administration of Michelle Bachelet —as well as the controversial dumping of more than 4,600 tons of decomposing salmon off the coast of Chiloé, carried out in March by the salmon industry with the authorization of the Government—provoked a social mobilization unprecedented in the history of Chiloé, which, by blocking routes and maritime access to the island, kept the archipelago paralyzed and isolated from the mainland for eighteen days —between the 2nd and the 19th of may-. The blockades and protests would end after all the mobilized communes reached agreements with the Government on economic aid, but the ban on extracting resources would remain in place for several months in various areas of the region, due to the presence of toxins.

The crisis generated harsh questions about the role of the Government during the emergency, as well as the salmon industry for its role in the emergency and the alleged impact of its operation on the environment.

References

Fishing in Chile
History of Chiloé
2016 in Chile
Natural disasters in Chile
Protests in Chile
Red tide
May 2016 events in South America